Piling may refer to:

 Pilings, deep foundations
 Stacking, placing items atop one another
 Disordered piling, a Japanese wallbuilding technique
 Pi-Ling, an ancient city where Changzhou now sits
 Chinese Piling paintings, the Pi-Ling style of art
 Piling Bay, Nunavut, Canada

See also
 
 
 Piling-up lemma
 Pressure piling, piling up of pressure
 Pile (disambiguation)
 Pilling (disambiguation)